The 2022 CARIFTA Games took place between 16 and 18 April 2022, after a two-year hiatus due to COVID-19 pandemic. The event was held at the Independence Park in Kingston, Jamaica.

Medal summary

Boys U-20

†: Open event for both junior and youth athletes.

Girls U-20

†: Open event for both junior and youth athletes.

Boys U-17 (Youth)

Girls U-17 (Youth)

Medal table

References 

CARIFTA Games
CARIFTA Games
CARIFTA Games
CARIFTA Games
CARIFTA Games
CARIFTA Games